Regatta Point is the location of a port and rail terminus on Macquarie Harbour (West Coast, Tasmania).

Port 
Regatta Point is often assumed into the name of the locality across the bay in Macquarie Harbour, Strahan, Tasmania.  The other ports in Macquarie Harbour were Strahan, and Pillinger at the southern end of the harbour.

Most shipping through the notorious Hells Gates is now the fishing fleet.

The last sea-based delivery of explosives for the Mount Lyell company occurred as late as 1976.

Railway terminus 
It was the port and terminus of the Mount Lyell Mining and Railway Company railway line from Queenstown.

When fully operational prior to closure in the 1960s, it was the location of the transfer of Mount Lyell materials to ships.

Regatta Point was the location of the connection between the Mount Lyell private railway and the government railway line which passed through Strahan on the way to Zeehan, when that line was operational.  It was possible to utilise passenger services from Queenstown to Burnie, using the Mount Lyell Line, the government line to Zeehan, and the Emu Bay Railway line to Burnie.

Railway building

An earlier building at the station location was burnt down in 1900.
It currently the terminus for the rebuilt West Coast Wilderness Railway. The remaining station building at Regatta Point has been restored for the new service, having lain at risk from the 1960s to the 1990s.

Railway stations sequence

From Regatta Point to Queenstown:
 Teepookana
 Dubbil Barril
 Rinadeena 
 Lynchford
 Queenstown (Tasmania) railway station

Nearest ports
Outside of Macquarie Harbour – on the north coast of Tasmania – Burnie or the south east Hobart – smaller anchorages exist in between – but are either facility free Port Davey or dangerous Trial Harbour.

See also

Railways on the West Coast of Tasmania
West Coast Tasmania Mines

Notes

References
 
 
 

Localities of West Coast Council
Mount Lyell Mining and Railway Company
Macquarie Harbour
Railway stations in Western Tasmania
West Coast Wilderness Railway